Clubiona norvegica is a species of sac spider in the family Clubionidae. It is found in North America, Europe, and Russia (European).

References

Clubionidae
Articles created by Qbugbot
Spiders described in 1900